"Bart Gets a 'Z" is the second episode of the twenty-first season of the American animated television series The Simpsons. It originally aired on the Fox network in the United States on October 4, 2009.

In the episode, the fourth grade students of Springfield Elementary School decide to spike Edna Krabappel's coffee in order to teach her a lesson after she takes away their cell phones. She is fired by Principal Skinner, who hires a new teacher named Zachary Vaughn. Although Vaughn is a hip young teacher who impresses the students, Bart is plagued by guilt and tries to get Edna hired back.

In its original airing, the episode had an estimated 9.32 million viewers and received a Nielsen rating of 5.1/8. The episode was written by Matt Selman, and directed by Mark Kirkland.

Plot
Edna Krabappel's positive attitude is crushed when she sees her students distracted from class by their cell phones, so she takes the devices away and puts them in the drawer with the biology frogs. This angers Bart and the other children, and Edna fails to stimulate their learning via other methods. The kids decide that Edna needs to "chill out" once in a while, and Bart understands that Homer is goofy and easy-going once he has had a few beers, so the students decide to spike Edna's coffee with liquor they steal from their parents. The next day, once she has consumed a mug of heavily spiked coffee, with sly encouragement from the kids, Edna becomes very intoxicated. She sings a loud, off-key, incoherent version of "This Old Man" with her students, and ends up hitting on Dewey Largo and disrupting an assembly bidding farewell to foreign exchange students.

Principal Skinner is reluctantly forced to fire Edna, and replaces her with a hip recent graduate of Tufts University named Zachary Vaughn. The students are immediately impressed with Zack, as he returns their cell phones and instructs them to use their electronic devices for classwork; his first assignment to them is “Twenty minutes of Twittering”. Bart raves to his mother about how much fun it is to have Zack as a teacher, but Marge worries about Edna's well-being, and Lisa doubts Zack's ability to teach. Bart goes to visit Edna and is stricken with guilt when he sees her moping in front of the television, and plots to get her rehired. He meets with Milhouse meet at a bookstore (where Moe is revealed to be a fan of Doris Kearns Goodwin), where they buy a self-help book entitled The Answer (a spoof of The Secret), which professes to have all the answers to help someone achieve their dreams. Edna is initially skeptical, but reveals her dream is to open a muffin shop. Using the book, she successfully opens a muffin shop that attracts several Springfielders including Ned Flanders. However, when Bart inadvertently confesses that he had the idea to spike her coffee with alcohol and therefore is responsible for getting her fired, Edna is furious and tells him that her real dream was to be a teacher, and is now facing heavy debt as well as competition from other newly opened muffin stores. Destroying the self-help book, Edna declares that Bart is the only kid she has ever met who is "bad on the inside".

Bart, deeply troubled by Edna's statement, sneaks into the school late at night to spike Zack's Blue Bronco energy drink and get Edna's old job back, but cannot go through with it and instead decides to tell Skinner the truth and face punishment. Skinner is pleased that Bart was honest and agrees to punish him for it, but tells him he cannot just rehire Edna when Zack is doing a good job in her place. Their conversation is suddenly disrupted by a belligerently drunk Zack – who ironically secretly mixes vodka in his own drink and mocks the schoolchildren, telling them they have no future because their education will not help them achieve real things in life. Groundskeeper Willie drags Zack away and Edna is reinstated. Bart hopes that there will be no hard feelings between Edna and himself. She responds by making every student in the class eat a stale muffin, as part of her "muffin-based revenge", and smiles as she stares out the window to the historical figures from The Answer, who nod in approval, indicating that she has fully accepted the teachings of the self-help book after all. They disappear in a flash of smoke as the end credits style of text mimics that of The Secret.

Production
The episode was written by Matt Selman, and directed by Mark Kirkland, marking the pair's writing and directorial debuts for the season. On Twitter, Selman said that the episode title was widely and wrongly assumed to be a simple play on words where the "Z" referred to Bart's new teacher being named Zachary; in fact, the title was devised during an early script where Zach's meltdown started with him giving all of the students "Z's" for their grades because he was staggeringly drunk, and even after it was decided to present Zach's meltdown differently everyone liked the title and kept it anyway.

Cultural references
The episode name is a reference to the name of the Season 2 episode "Bart Gets an 'F', which was also referenced in the same season episode "Bart's Dog Gets an "F", and the Season 10 episode "Lisa Gets an 'A'. The novel Bart reads called "The Answer" is a parody of film and book, The Secret. The song heard with Edna in the morning is a Paul McCartney song titled "Another Day". The store Mrs. Krabappel opens is called "Edna's Edibles", a reference to the store that Mrs. Garrett owned on The Facts of Life. Another muffin store on the street is called "H.R. Muffin Stuff," a reference to the 1969 show H.R. Pufnstuf.   The film Edna is watching when Bart comes by to see how she is doing both parodies and references the 1986 Rodney Dangerfield film Back to School.

Reception
In its original airing, the episode had an estimated 9.32 million viewers and received a Nielsen rating of 5.1/8.

Robert Canning of IGN gave the episode a 6.9/10 and also stated the episode was "...neither hilarious nor incredibly terrible. It's middle of the road, but has just enough going for it that a fan will enjoy the episode."

Emily VanDerWerff of The A.V. Club gave the episode a C+ and also stated "So I liked the Krabappel and Bart stuff, but everything else was pretty bad."

References

External links

The Simpsons (season 21) episodes
2009 American television episodes